The 46th Venice Biennale, held in 1995, was an exhibition of international contemporary art, with 51 participating nations. The Venice Biennale takes place biennially in Venice, Italy. Prizewinners of the 46th Biennale included: Ronald Kitaj (Golden Lion for painting), Gary Hill (Golden Lion for sculpture), the Egyptian pavilion (best national participation), and Kathy Prendergast (best young artist).

Awards 

 International Prizes: Golden Lion for painting – Ronald Kitaj; Golden Lion for sculpture – Gary Hill
 Golden Lion for best national participation: Egypt
 Premio 2000 (young artist): Kathy Prendergast
 Special awards: Nunzio, Hirosi Senji, Jehon Soo Cheon, Richard Kriesche
 Premia (purchase) Cassa di Risparmio Foundation: Ignacio Iturria

References

Bibliography

Further reading 

 
 
 
 
 
 
 
 
 

1995 in art
1995 in Italy
Venice Biennale exhibitions